Dmitry Anatolyevich Zherebchenko (born 27 June 1989) is a Russian foil fencer, gold medallist in the 2017 World Championships. Zherebchenko was a substitute for Russia's foil team which took gold at the 2016 Summer Olympics in Rio de Janeiro, but as he did not fence in the competition he was not deemed an Olympian and did not receive a medal.

References

External links
 
  (archive)
  (archive)

1989 births
Living people
Russian male foil fencers
Sportspeople from Kursk Oblast
Fencers at the 2015 European Games
European Games medalists in fencing
European Games bronze medalists for Russia
Universiade gold medalists for Russia
Universiade medalists in fencing
Medalists at the 2009 Summer Universiade
World Fencing Championships medalists
21st-century Russian people